Chelepteryx chalepteryx, the white stemmed wattle moth or white-stemmed acacia moth, is a moth of the family Anthelidae. The species was first described by Rudolf Felder in 1874. It is found in Australia.

The wingspan of reaches up to 10 cm. Males have a more intense colouration. The caterpillars of this species feed mainly on wattles and gymea lily.

Distribution
It is seen mainly in eastern Australia, including Queensland, New South Wales and Victoria, as well as Lord Howe Island.

See also
List of moths of Australia

References

External links

"Chelepteryx chalepteryx (R. Felder, 1874)". The Atlas of Living Australia.
White-stemmed Acacia Moth on Vimeo

Moths described in 1874
Anthelidae
Endemic fauna of Australia